This list includes relevant Bluegrass, Rockabilly, Country blues, Country rock, Dobro, Slide Guitar, and Pedal Steel Guitar

Country Music